The Peddler of Lies is a 1920 American mystery film directed by William C. Dowlan and written by Philip D. Hurn. It is based on the 1919 novel The Peddler by Henry C. Rowland. The film stars Frank Mayo, Ora Carew, Ora Devereaux, Harold Miller, Dagmar Godowsky and Bonnie Hill. The film was released on March 1, 1920, by Universal Film Manufacturing Company.

Cast       
Frank Mayo as Clamp
Ora Carew as Diana
Ora Devereaux as Leontine de Vallignac
Harold Miller as James Kirkland 
Dagmar Godowsky as Patricia Melton
Bonnie Hill as Marquise d'Irancy
Flora Hollister
Truman Van Dyke
Ray Ripley
Esther Ralston

References

External links
 

1920 films
American mystery films
1920 mystery films
Universal Pictures films
Films directed by William C. Dowlan
American silent feature films
American black-and-white films
1920s English-language films
1920s American films
Silent mystery films